Sihanouk Boulevard is a central boulevard of Phnom Penh which is the capital of Cambodia. The boulevard crosses the city in an east–west direction. It is named in honour of the late King Norodom Sihanouk, one of the country's greatest kings. 

It crosses with the east–west Norodom Boulevard at Independence Monument and near Wat Lanka. It crosses Samdech Hun Sen Boulevard.

Wat Moha Montrey is located on the boulevard in the western area of the city. The Lucky Supermarket is located approximately  after it crosses with Monivong Boulevard which passes through the entire city in a north–south direction in the centre. The boulevard circles around Independence Monument, which is located just south of the Embassy of North Korea.

References

Roads in Cambodia
Transport in Phnom Penh
Boulevards